Moka is a village in Mauritius located in the Moka District, the western part of the village also lies in the Plaines Wilhems District. Since 1967 it forms part of Constituency No. 8 Quartier Militaire and Moka. The village is administered by the Moka Village Council under the aegis of the Moka District Council. According to the census made by Statistics Mauritius in 2011, the population was at 8,846. The elevation is 203 meters and can be up to 425 meters in some places. Moka is directly on the other side of the Moka Range from Port Louis. The village is close to the mountain Le Pouce and the town Beau-Bassin Rose-Hill. Réduit is a suburb of the village where the State House and University of Mauritius is situated. The village is also home to the Mauritius Broadcasting Corporation and the Mahatma Gandhi Institute.

History

Housing boom
Moka is centrally located in Mauritius and as such has experienced a real estate development boom in the past few years. This was mainly encouraged by the development of the CyberCity two kilometres away in Ebene. Another contributing factor to this property business was the fact that since Mauritius will not benefit from preferential prices for its sugar by the European Community and World Trade Organization, sugar estates quickly started real estate business units that would convert the land under sugar cane culture to residential lands. From 2004 to 2006, Moka saw five property estate developments.

Weather
Moka has a tropical wet climate. Since it is in the southern hemisphere, February is the warmest month and August is the coolest. The dry season is in October, the wet season is in February. Temperature is somewhat constant.

Places

Schools
Schools in Moka include Le Bocage International School, Mahatma Gandhi Institute, Mahatma Gandhi Secondary School, St. Mary Roman Catholic School, and Ecole du Centre.

University

University of Mauritius
Charles Telfair Institute

Other
Other important institutions in Moka are the:
 Agricultural Marketing Board (AMB) which stocks vegetables (mainly potatoes) for local consumption
 Subramaniam Bharati Eye Centre (AKA Moka Eye Hospital) which is the country's only specialized eye hospital.
 Catholic Church

Notable people
Jean Louis Brue du Garoutier, French soldier later retrieving the rank of Maréchal de Camp (Brigade General) under Napoleon and serving as commander of the 2nd Brigade, 4th Infantry Division during the Waterloo Campaign.
Thomas Shadrach James (Peersahib), teacher, linguist and herbalist in Australia
Fabrice Lapierre, Mauritian-born Australian long jumper

See also 
 List of places in Mauritius

References 

Moka District
Populated places in Mauritius